The AFI Life Achievement Award was established by the board of directors of the American Film Institute on February 26, 1973, to honor a single individual for his or her lifetime contribution to enriching American culture through motion pictures and television. The recipient is selected and honored at an annual ceremony, with the award presented by a master of ceremonies and, recently, the prior year's recipient.

The trustees initially specified that the recipient must be one who fundamentally advanced the art of film and whose achievements had been acknowledged by the general public as well as by film scholars, critics and the individual's peers. The trustees also specified that the work of the recipient must have withstood the test of time.

History of the award 
Director John Ford was the unanimous choice of the board of trustees for the first award as he "clearly stands preeminent in the history of motion pictures."
 
President Richard Nixon attended the gala dinner at which Ford was presented the award on March 31, 1973.

The board of trustees later amended the "test of time" requirement to enable the AFI Life Achievement Award to be presented to individuals with active careers, such as Steven Spielberg.

Trivia 
Lillian Gish was awarded the AFI Life Achievement Award in 1984, aged 90, becoming the oldest recipient of the prize; Mel Brooks was the oldest male recipient, awarded at age 86 in 2013. Tom Hanks was awarded the AFI Life Achievement Award in 2002, becoming the youngest recipient of the prize at age 46 and Meryl Streep was the youngest female, awarded at age 54 in 2004.

Of the 48 honorees eleven have been women: Bette Davis (the first female recipient), Lillian Gish, Barbara Stanwyck, Elizabeth Taylor, Barbra Streisand, Meryl Streep, Shirley MacLaine, Jane Fonda, Diane Keaton, Julie Andrews, and Nicole Kidman.

Composer John Williams was the first recipient of the award to not be an actor or director.

Three sets of family members have received the award: father and son Kirk and Michael Douglas, father and daughter Henry and Jane Fonda, and siblings Warren Beatty and Shirley MacLaine.

Julie Andrews' award event was originally scheduled for April 25, 2020, with a broadcast on May 7 on TNT, but the event was postponed for 2021, due to the COVID-19 pandemic. This marks the first time an AFI Life Achievement Award event was delayed. The event was rescheduled for November 11th, 2021, before it was postponed a second time on October 5th, 2021.

Televised broadcast 
All Life Achievement Award ceremonies have been televised on major TV networks and cable channels: CBS, NBC, ABC, Fox, USA, TV Land, TNT and TBS. Agreeing to appear at the televised ceremony apparently is part of the AFI's criteria for selecting the award. The televised ceremony generates income for the AFI, which is no longer funded by the US government.

Recipients 
The American Film Institute has awarded the AFI Life Achievement Award to one person each year since 1973. The 49th Award will be presented to Nicole Kidman in Los Angeles on June 10th, 2023.

See also 
 Cecil B. DeMille Award

Notes

External links 
 

Life Achievement Award
Lifetime achievement awards